Cristina del Valle (born 1 August 1960) is a Spanish singer and activist.

Biography 
Cristina del Valle was born in Oviedo, Asturias, Spain.

In 1980, she went to Madrid to study criminology and since 1978, she has worked in several social action groups, NGOs (Ayora, Solidarios, Apram, and others) and left-wing political parties which worked in support of human rights, for the Sahrawi people or against domestic violence.

As a singer, she started with the band Vodebil, but she released her first solo-album in 1989, Cris. In 1991, after meeting her sentimental partner Alberto Comesaña, the couple decided to launch the musical duo Amistades Peligrosas, which grew to great success. The group split in 1996, but returned in 2003 with the album La larga espera. She has also collaborated in several musical projects like Tatuaje, where she played María de la O. Hevia was as well her sentimental partner.

Prizes 
Mujer del año 1998, Valdés (Asturias)
Premio Comadre de oro de [Antroxu] 1999
Premio Vaqueira, 1999
Premio Flor de Manzana, Villaviciosa (Asturias)
Premio Racimo de oro 1999, Jerez
Premio Unión General de Trabajadores (UGT) "Mujer 99”
Premio Luarca 1999
Premio T de Tarde a la Tolerancia 2000
Premio radio Gorbea 2001
Premio Nosotras 2001

Discography

Solo career 
Cris, 1989
Siempre te metes en líos,1990
El Dios de las Pequeñas cosas, 1999
Apuntes generales del mundo, 2001
Tiempos Rotos 2009

With Alberto Comesaña in Amistades Peligrosas 
Relatos de una intriga, 1991
La última Tentación, 1993
La Profecía, 1995
Nueva Era, 1997
La larga espera, 2003
Recopilatorio Amistades Peligrosas
El arte de amar (2013)

External links 
Biografía

People from Oviedo
Living people
Spanish women singers
1960 births